Staraya is a rural locality (a village) in Krasnoplamenskoye Rural Settlement, Alexandrovsky District, Vladimir Oblast, Russia. The population was 11 as of 2010. There are 3 streets.

Geography 
The village is located 17 km south-west from Krasnoye Plamya, 22 km north-west from Alexandrov.

References 

 https://timesofindia.indiatimes.com/world/rest-of-world/Ancient-Vishnu-idol-found-in-Russian-town/articleshow/1046928.cms

Rural localities in Alexandrovsky District, Vladimir Oblast